The eastern grass owl (Tyto longimembris), also known as Chinese grass owl or Australian grass owl, is a species of owl in the family Tytonidae. They feed predominantly on small rodents.

Though some authorities consider this owl to be conspecific with the African grass owl, T. capensis, other consider it to be a valid species.

Description
The eastern grass owl is a medium-sized owl, similar in size to the barn owl. The female weighs  while the male weighs . They have dark brown or tan upper parts with pale spots. They have black and tan bars on its wings and a very pale beak, feathered legs, and dark brown eyes. Like all Tyto owls, it has a heart-shaped facial disk with brown buff and a white bordering.

Call
The eastern grass owl's primary call is like many other tyto owls. A loud, hissing screech but the grass owl's screech is louder than a barn owl's but quieter than a masked owl's.

Hunting
Studies in parts of Australia have shown that the most common prey is the long-haired rat and the cane rat. Prey are detected from on the wing. The owl uses its long legs to penetrate dense ground cover and seize its prey.

Habitat
This owl prefers tall grasslands and swamps. Roost areas consist of flattened vegetation within systems of "tunnels" through the swamp vegetation. Nesting is in similar situations.

Distribution
Eastern grass owls live in eastern, southern and southeast Asia, parts of New Guinea, Australia (mainly in Queensland) and the western Pacific. It has also been found in the coastal islands.

Conservation status
Eastern grass owls are considered "least concern" globally, primarily because of their wide distribution. Within Australia, Tyto longimembris is considered vulnerable on the New South Wales Threatened Species Conservation Act (1995).

References

External links

HBW species page
Birdlife species factsheet

eastern grass owl
Birds of East Asia
Birds of South Asia
Birds of Southeast Asia
Birds of prey of Oceania
Birds of Queensland
Diurnal raptors of Australia
eastern grass owl
Taxonomy articles created by Polbot